Hamilton Pereira (born June 26, 1987 in Montevideo) is a Uruguayan footballer currently playing for Cerro Largo.

Career
Born in Tacuarembó, Pereira began playing football with local side Tacuarembó FC in the Uruguayan league. He joined Peñarol where he would win the 2009–10 Uruguayan Primera División championship. After a spell with River Plate, he moved on loan to Liga MX side Monarcas Morelia in 2014.

Titles
Peñarol
 Uruguayan Primera División (1): 2009–10

Morelia
Supercopa MX (1): 2014

References

External links
 Profile at BDFA Profile at
 Profile at Soccerway Profile at

1987 births
Living people
Uruguayan footballers
Uruguayan expatriate footballers
Tacuarembó F.C. players
Peñarol players
Club Atlético River Plate (Montevideo) players
Atlético Morelia players
Danubio F.C. players
Barcelona S.C. footballers
Club Atlético Sarmiento footballers
Club Atlético Tigre footballers
Club Atlético Los Andes footballers
Deportivo Maldonado players
Cerro Largo F.C. players
Liga MX players
Argentine Primera División players
Primera Nacional players
Ecuadorian Serie A players
Uruguayan Primera División players
Uruguayan Segunda División players
Expatriate footballers in Argentina
Expatriate footballers in Mexico
Expatriate footballers in Ecuador
Uruguayan expatriate sportspeople in Argentina
Uruguayan expatriate sportspeople in Mexico
Uruguayan expatriate sportspeople in Ecuador
Association football midfielders